Handball has featured as a sport at the European Youth Summer Olympic Festival since its fourth edition in 1997. It has appeared on the programme at every subsequent edition of the biennial multi-sport event.

Medal count

Men's tournaments

Women's tournaments

See also 
Athletics at the European Youth Olympic Festival

References 
 Danish Handball Federation 
 Eurolympic Results
 Lugano 2005 Results 

 
European Youth Olympic Festival
Handball competitions in Europe
Sports at the European Youth Summer Olympic Festival
Youth handball